Le Mée-sur-Seine (literally Le Mée on Seine) is a commune in the Seine-et-Marne department in the Île-de-France region in north-central France, next to Melun. It is located in the south-eastern suburbs of Paris  from the center.

Geography
The town is located on the right side of the Seine on a limestone plateau.

History
 B.C.: the Sénons (Gaul tribe) may have lived here.
 13th century: Le Mée-sur-Seine is mentioned for the first time by "Mas" in 1253. "Mas" is an old French term for farm.
 15th century: castle of "Marchémarais"
 September, 30th, 1833: birth of Henri Chapu, a famous sculptor.
 1889: construction of the "Église Notre-Dame-de-la-Nativité".
 1845: first railway.
 1938: Originally called simply "Le Mée", the name of the commune became officially "Le Mée-sur-Seine" (meaning "Le Mée upon Seine")
 1944: Liberation of the town by allied troops who crossed the Seine using a float-bridge (the only bridge had been destroyed by the Germans).
 1970-1971: construction of the main road to Melun (la pénétrante).
 1979: opening of the new rail station.
The town grew quickly after World War II, and it is now divided in four districts: Le Mée Village, Plein Ciel, Croix Blanche, Les Courtilleraies.

Demographics
Inhabitants are called Méens.

Education
There are 11 infant schools, 8 garde schools, 2 secondary schools and 1 high school.

Culture
 "Le Mas": library and auditorium.
 "Espace Cordier": Youth House for Culture.

Religions
 "Église Notre-Dame-de-la-Nativité" ("Village" District), built from 1889 to 1893, is on the location of the previous church (built in 1771).
 chapel "Sainte-Croix" ("Croix-Blanche" District)

Economy

 Unemployment rate (1999): 12.8%
 Private income  (2004): €15,136/year

Transport
Le Mée-sur-Seine is served by Le Mée-sur-Seine station on Paris RER line , approximately 45 minutes from the centre of Paris.
Local bus network: Bus TRAM: lines B, F, J,  J1, M.

People
 Jacques Philippe Avice (1759–1835), general, and also tile maker around 1820.
 François-Joseph Talma (1763–1826), actor, he was also co-owner of the tile manufactory.
 Mademoiselle Mars (1779–1847), actress, she was also co-owner of the tile manufactory.
 Charles-Tristan de Montholon (1782–1853), general and politician, he was also co-owner of the tile manufactory.
 Grégoire Ghyka (see Grigore Alexandru Ghica (1807–1857), prince of Moldavia (1849–1853 and 1854–1856) lived in "Le Mée," where he committed suicide on August 24, 1857. His wife and five other relatives are interred close to him in a memorial in the cemetery of the town. Close to this memorial, four other members of the Ghyka family repose (among whom Nicolas Jean Ghika (1849–1873), killed during a duel at Fontainebleau).
Henri Chapu, famous sculptor, was born in "Le Mée" in September, 30th, 1833. He was interred on April 24, 1891.
 Firmin-Girard (1838–1921), painter. He has been interred close to Henri Chapu.
 Henri-Auguste Patey (1855–1930), sculptor, student of Henri Chapu.
 Gaston Carraud (1864–1920), songwriter, student of Jules Massenet, was born in "Le Mée" in July, 20th, 1864.
 Renée Saint-Cyr (1904–2004), actress, lived in a big 18th century house in "Le Mée".
 Karl Lagerfeld (1933-2019), designer, owned a big house in the "Village" District.
 Caroline de Monaco (1957-) and Ernest-Auguste de Hanovre (1954-) own the house previously occupied by Karl Lagerfeld.
 Nina Roberts (1979-) ex-porn star
 Willy Denzey (1982-) singer for teenagers.

See also
Communes of the Seine-et-Marne department

References

External links

Official website 
1999 Land Use, from IAURIF (Institute for Urban Planning and Development of the Paris-Île-de-France région) 

Communes of Seine-et-Marne